Paul Martin Lester (born March 21, 1953) is a Clinical Professor at the School of Arts, Technology, and Emerging Communication (ATEC) and a Professor Emeritus from California State University, Fullerton.

Lester was born in Flushing, Queens.  After an undergraduate degree in journalism from the University of Texas at Austin and employment as a photojournalist for The Times-Picayune in New Orleans, he received a Master's from the University of Minnesota and a Ph.D. from Indiana University in mass communications.

Lester co-wrote a monthly column, "Ethics Matters" for News Photographer magazine for the National Press Photographers Association. From 2006, Lester was the editor of the Visual Communication Quarterly until 2011 when he was named editor of Journalism & Communication Monographs sponsored by the AEJMC and published by Sage. His research interests include mass media ethics, new communications technologies, and visual communications.

Lester has given speeches, presentations, and workshops throughout the United States and in Australia, Canada, Finland, the Netherlands, Northern Ireland, Spain, Sweden, and Turkey.

Personal life 
Lester is married to xtine burrough. He has a daughter, Allison Lester, and two sons, Parker and Martin Lester.

University 
Paul Martin Lester is a Clinical Professor at the School of Arts, Technology, and Emerging Communication (ATEC) and instructs a course surrounding the Ethics in New Media, Technology, and Communication. Despite instructing such a course, Lester, according to ratemyprofessors.com, is widely criticized by his students, who have stated the following: "shows no understanding", "Terrible grading policy", and "Thinks way too highly of himself". Lester, according to ratemyprofessors.com, is also currently (May, 2022) the 7th lowest rated Professor at the University of Texas at Dallas within the Arts & Technology department, holding a mere 2.1 out of 5 stars in terms of quality.

Books 
Visual Ethics A Guide for Photographers, Journalists, and Filmmakers (2018)
Digital Innovations for Mass Communication Engaging the User (2014)
Visual Communication on the Web (2013) with Xtine Burrough.
Visual Communication Images with Messages  1st ed, 1996 ; latest (7th) Edition 2017. According to WorldCat, the book is held in 488 libraries  
translated into Chinese by  Xiaoting Zhang; Meixue Yang as 視覺傳播/Shi jue chuan bo
Images that Injure Pictorial Stereotypes in the Media. Co-edited with Susan Ross, 1st ed. 19966 ; 3rd Edition  (2011)   Santa Barbara:Prager. According to WorldCat, the  book is held in 3792 libraries.
On Floods and Photo Ops: How Herbert Hoover and George W. Bush Exploited Catastrophes Jackson : University Press of Mississippi, 2010.
The Zen of Photography (2007). [Persian Edition].
Visual Journalism A Guide for New Media Professionals with Christopher R. Harris.  Boston : Allyn and Bacon,  2002.
The Spiral Web On the Nature of Coincidence (2000).
The Zen of Photography (2000).
Desktop Computing Workbook A Guide for Using 15 Programs in Macintosh and Windows Formats (1996).
Photojournalism An Ethical Approach (1991).
Ethics of Photojournalism (1990), (ed.).

References

External links 
  Website

University of Texas at Dallas faculty
California State University, Fullerton faculty
1953 births
Living people
Moody College of Communication alumni
University of Minnesota alumni
Indiana University alumni
Communication scholars